Paradise Township may refer to:

 Paradise Township, Coles County, Illinois
 Paradise Township, Crawford County, Iowa
 Paradise Township, Russell County, Kansas
 Paradise Township, Michigan
 Paradise Township, Eddy County, North Dakota, in Eddy County, North Dakota
 Paradise Township, Lancaster County, Pennsylvania
 Paradise Township, Monroe County, Pennsylvania
 Paradise Township, York County, Pennsylvania

Township name disambiguation pages